Myshkino is a rural locality (a selo) in Konstantinovsky Selsoviet, Kulundinsky District, Altai Krai, Russia. The population was 374 as of 2013. There are 2 streets.

Geography 
Myshkino is located 7 km northeast of Kulunda (the district's administrative centre) by road. Kulunda is the nearest rural locality.

References 

Rural localities in Kulundinsky District